Basket weaving (also basketry or basket making) is the process of weaving or sewing pliable materials into three-dimensional artifacts, such as baskets, mats, mesh bags or even furniture. Craftspeople and artists specialized in making baskets may be known as basket makers and basket weavers. Basket weaving is also a rural craft.

Basketry is made from a variety of fibrous or pliable materials—anything that will bend and form a shape. Examples include pine, straw, willow, oak, wisteria, forsythia, vines, stems, animal hair, hide, grasses, thread, and fine wooden splints. There are many applications for basketry, from simple mats to hot air balloon gondolas.

Many Indigenous peoples are renowned for their basket-weaving techniques.

History
While basket weaving is one of the widest spread crafts in the history of any human civilization, it is hard to say just how old the craft is, because natural materials like wood, grass, and animal remains decay naturally and constantly. So without proper preservation, much of the history of basket making has been lost and is simply speculated upon.

Middle East 
The earliest reliable evidence for basket weaving technology in the Middle East comes from the Pre-Pottery Neolithic phases of Tell Sabi Abyad II and Çatalhöyük. Although no actual basketry remains were recovered, impressions on floor surfaces and on fragments of bitumen suggest that basketry objects were used for storage and architectural purposes. The extremely well-preserved Early Neolithic ritual cave site of Nahal Hemar yielded thousands of intact perishable artefacts, including basketry containers, fabrics, and various types of cordage. Additional Neolithic basketry impressions have been uncovered at Tell es-Sultan (Jericho), Netiv HaGdud, Beidha, Shir, Tell Sabi Abyad III, Domuztepe, Umm Dabaghiyah, Tell Maghzaliyah, Tepe Sarab, Jarmo, and Ali Kosh.

The oldest known baskets were discovered in Faiyum in upper Egypt and have been carbon dated to between 10,000 and 12,000 years old, earlier than any established dates for archaeological evidence of pottery vessels, which were too heavy and fragile to suit far-ranging hunter-gatherers. The oldest and largest complete basket, discovered in the Negev in the Middle East, dates to 10,500 years old. However, baskets seldom survive, as they are made from perishable materials. The most common evidence of a knowledge of basketry is an imprint of the weave on fragments of clay pots, formed by packing clay on the walls of the basket and firing.

Industrial Revolution
During the Industrial Revolution, baskets were used in factories and for packing and deliveries. Wicker furniture became fashionable in Victorian society.

World Wars
During the World Wars some pannier baskets were used for dropping supplies of ammunition and food to the troops.

Types
Basketry may be classified into four types:
 Coiled basketry, using grasses, rushes and pine needles
 Plaiting basketry, using materials that are wide and braid-like: palms, yucca or New Zealand flax
 Twining basketry, using materials from roots and tree bark. This is a weaving technique where two or more flexible weaving elements ("weavers") cross each other as they weave through the stiffer radial spokes.
 Wicker and Splint basketry, using materials like reed, cane, willow, oak, and ash

Materials used in basketry

Weaving with rattan core (also known as reed) is one of the more popular techniques being practiced, because it is easily available. It is pliable, and when woven correctly, it is very sturdy. Also, while traditional materials like oak, hickory, and willow might be hard to come by, reed is plentiful and can be cut into any size or shape that might be needed for a pattern. This includes flat reed, which is used for most square baskets; oval reed, which is used for many round baskets; and round reed, which is used to twine; another advantage is that reed can also be dyed easily to look like oak or hickory.

Many types of plants can be used to create baskets: dog rose, honeysuckle, blackberry briars once the thorns have been scraped off and many other creepers. Willow was used for its flexibility and the ease with which it could be grown and harvested. Willow baskets were commonly referred to as wickerwork in England.

Water hyacinth is used as a base material in some areas where the plant has become a serious pest. For example, a group in Ibadan led by Achenyo Idachaba have been creating handicrafts in Nigeria.

Vine
Because vines have always been readily accessible and plentiful for weavers, they have been a common choice for basketry purposes. The runners are preferable to the vine stems because they tend to be straighter. Pliable materials like kudzu vine to more rigid, woody vines like bittersweet, grapevine, honeysuckle, wisteria and smokevine are good basket weaving materials. Although many vines are not uniform in shape and size, they can be manipulated and prepared in a way that makes them easily used in traditional and contemporary basketry.  Most vines can be split and dried to store until use.  Once vines are ready to be used, they can be soaked or boiled to increase pliability.

Wicker
The type of baskets that reed is used for are most often referred to as "wicker" baskets, though another popular type of weaving known as "twining" is also a technique used in most wicker baskets.

Popular styles of wicker baskets are vast, but some of the more notable styles in the United States are Nantucket Baskets and Williamsburg Baskets. Nantucket Baskets are large and bulky, while Williamsburg Baskets can be any size, so long as the two sides of the basket bow out slightly and get larger as it is weaved up.

Process 

The parts of a basket are the base, the side walls, and the rim.  A basket may also have a lid, handle, or embellishments.

Most baskets begin with a base.  The base can either be woven with reed or wooden.  A wooden base can come in many shapes to make a wide variety of shapes of baskets.  The "static" pieces of the work are laid down first. In a round basket, they are referred to as "spokes"; in other shapes, they are called "stakes" or "staves". Then the "weavers" are used to fill in the sides of a basket.

A wide variety of patterns can be made by changing the size, colour, or placement of a certain style of weave. To achieve a multi-coloured effect, aboriginal artists first dye the twine and then weave the twines together in complex patterns.

Basketry around the world

Asia

South Asia 

Basketry exists throughout the Indian subcontinent. Since palms are found in the south, basket weaving with this material has a long tradition in Tamil Nadu and surrounding states.

East Asia 

Chinese bamboo weaving, Taiwanese bamboo weaving, Japanese bamboo weaving and Korean bamboo weaving go back centuries. Bamboo is the prime material for making all sorts of baskets, since it is the main material that is available and suitable for basketry. Other materials that may be used are ratan and hemp palm.

In Japan, bamboo weaving is registered as a traditional  with a range of fine and decorative arts.

Southeast Asia 

Southeast Asia has thousands of sophisticated forms of indigenous basketry produce, many of which use ethnic-endemic techniques. Materials used vary considerably, depending on the ethnic group and the basket art intended to be made. Bamboo, grass, banana, reeds, and trees are common mediums.

Oceania

Polynesia
Basketry is a traditional practice across the Pacific islands of Polynesia. It uses natural materials like pandanus, coconut fibre, hibiscus fibre, and New Zealand flax according to local custom. Baskets are used for food and general storage, carrying personal goods, and fishing.

Australia
Basketry has been traditionally practised by the women of many Aboriginal Australian peoples across the continent for centuries.

The Ngarrindjeri women of southern South Australia have a tradition of coiled basketry, using the sedge grasses growing near the lakes and mouth of the Murray River.

The fibre basketry of the Gunditjmara people is noted as a cultural tradition, in the World Heritage Listing of the Budj Bim Cultural Landscape in western Victoria, Australia, used for carrying the short-finned eels that were farmed by the people in an extensive aquaculture system.

North America

Native American Basketry

Native Americans traditionally make their baskets from the materials available locally.

Arctic and Subarctic
Arctic and Subarctic tribes use sea grasses for basketry. At the dawn of the 20th century, Inupiaq men began weaving baskets from baleen, a substance derived from whale jaws, and incorporating walrus ivory and whale bone in basketry.

Northeastern

In New England, they weave baskets from Swamp Ash. The wood is peeled off a felled log in strips, following the growth rings of the tree. Maine and Great Lakes tribes use black ash splints. They also weave baskets from sweet grass, as do Canadian tribes.
Birchbark is used throughout the Subarctic, by a wide range of tribes from Dene to Ojibwa to Mi'kmaq. Birchbark baskets are often embellished with dyed porcupine quills. Some of the more notable styles are Nantucket Baskets and Williamsburg Baskets. Nantucket Baskets are large and bulky, while Williamsburg Baskets can be any size, so long as the two sides of the basket bow out slightly and get larger as it is woven up.
Kelly Church (Grand Traverse Band of Ottawa and Chippewa Indians)

Southeastern
Southeastern tribes, such as the Atakapa, Cherokee, Choctaw, and Chitimacha, traditionally use split river cane for basketry. A particularly difficult technique for which these tribes are known is double-weave or double-wall basketry, in which each basketry is formed by an interior and exterior wall seamlessly woven together. Doubleweave, although rare, is still practiced today, for instance by Mike Dart (Cherokee Nation).
Rowena Bradley (Cherokee Nation)
Mike Dart (Cherokee Nation)

Northwestern

Northwestern tribes use spruce root, cedar bark, and swampgrass. Ceremonial basketry hats are particularly valued by Northeast tribes and are worn today at potlatches. Traditionally, women wove basketry hats, and men painted designs on them. Delores Churchill is a Haida from Alaska who began weaving in a time when Haida basketry was in decline, but she and others have ensured it will continue by teaching the next generation.

Delores Churchill (Haida)
Joe Feddersen (Colville)
Boeda Strand (Snohomish)

Californian and Great Basin

Indigenous peoples of California and Great Basin are known for their basketry skills. Coiled baskets are particularly common, woven from sumac, yucca, willow, and basket rush. The works by Californian basket makers include many pieces in museums. 
Elsie Allen (Pomo people)
Mary Knight Benson (Pomo people)
William Ralganal Benson (Pomo people)
Carrie Bethel (Mono Lake Paiute)
Loren Bommelyn (Tolowa)
Nellie Charlie (Mono Lake Paiute/Kucadikadi)
Louisa Keyser "Dat So La Lee" (Washoe people) is arguably the most famous Native American weaver.
Lena Frank Dick (1889-1965) (Washoe people) followed behind Keyser by one generation, and her baskets were frequently mistaken for Keyser's.
L. Frank (Tongva-Acagchemem)
Sarah Jim Mayo (Washoe)
Mabel McKay (Pomo people)
Essie Pinola Parrish (Kashaya-Pomo)
Lucy Telles (Mono Lake Paiute - Kucadikadi)

Southwestern
Annie Antone (Tohono O'odham)
Damian Jim (Navajo)
Terrol Dew Johnson (Tohono O'odham)

Mexico
 
In northwestern Mexico, the Seri people continue to "sew" baskets using splints of the limberbush plant, Jatropha cuneata.

Other North American Basketry
Matt Tommey is a North American artist who weaves sculptural baskets out of kudzu.
Mary Jackson is a world-famous African-American sweetgrass basket weaver. In 2008, she was named a MacArthur Fellow for her basket weaving.

Europe
In Greece, basket weaving is practiced by the anchorite monks of Mount Athos.

Africa

Senegal 
Wolof baskets are a coil basket created by the Wolof tribe of Senegal. These baskets is considered a women's craft, which have been passed across generations. The Wolof baskets were traditionally made by using thin cuts of palm frond and a thick grass called njodax; however contemporary Wolof baskets often incorporate plastic as a replacement for the palm fronds and/or re-use of discarded prayer mat materials. These baskets are strong and used for laundry hampers, planters, bowls, rugs, and more.

South Africa 
Zulu baskets are a traditional craft in the KwaZulu-Natal province of South Africa and were used for utilitarian purposes including holding water, beer, or food; the baskets can take many months to weave. Starting in the late 1960s, Zulu basketry was a dying art form due to the introduction of tin and plastic water containers. Kjell Lofroth, a Swedish minister living in South Africa, noticed a decline in the local crafts, and after a drought in the KwaZulu-Natal province and he formed the Vukani Arts Association (English: wake up and get going) to financially support single women and their families. In this time period of the late 1960s, only three elderly women knew the craft of Zulu basket weaving but because of the Vukani Arts Association they taught others and revived the art. Beauty Ngxongo is the most renowned living Zulu basket weaver.

Zulu telephone wire baskets are a contemporary craft. These are often brightly colored baskets and made with telephone wire (sometimes from a recycled source), which is a substitute for native grasses.

See also 
 Native American basket weavers
 Basketry of Mexico
 Elizabeth Hickox
 Fully feathered basket 
 Pecos Classification
 Putcher
 Sebucan
 Underwater basket weaving
 Willow Man
 Withy
 Easter basket
Amakan
Kete (basket)

References

Further reading

Blanchard, M. M. (1928) The Basketry Book. New York: Charles Scribner's Sons
Bobart, H. H. (1936) Basket Work through the Ages. London: Oxford University Press
Okey, Thomas (1930) A Basketful of Memories: an autobiographical sketch. London: J. M. Dent
Okey, Thomas (1912)  An Introduction to the Art of Basket-making. (Pitman's Handwork Series.) London: Pitman
Wright, Dorothy (1959) Baskets and Basketry. London: B. T. Batsford

External links 

California Indian Basketweavers Association
The National Basketry Organization
The Book of English Trades, and Library of the Useful Arts, page 17-22
Handbook of American Indians North of Mexico. V. 1/4, page 132-135
 Spons' Workshop: Basket hand-making
Native Paths: American Indian Art from the Collection of Charles and Valerie Diker, an exhibition catalog from The Metropolitan Museum of Art (available as PDF), with material on basket weaving

 
Indigenous peoples of California topics
Crafts